Anibontes is a genus of North American dwarf spiders that was first described by Ralph Vary Chamberlin in 1924.  it contains only two species, both found in the United States: A. longipes and A. mimus.

See also
 List of Linyphiidae species

References

Araneomorphae genera
Linyphiidae
Spiders of the United States